Oligonyx is a genus of mantises in the family Thespidae.

Species 
The following species are recognised in the genus Oligonyx:
 Oligonyx bicornis Saussure, 1869
 Oligonyx bidens Saussure & Zehntner, 1894
 Oligonyx dohrnianus Saussure & Zehntner, 1894
 Oligonyx insularis Bonfils, 1967
 Oligonyx maya Saussure & Zehntner, 1894

See also
 List of mantis genera and species

References

Thespidae
Mantodea genera
Taxa named by Henri Louis Frédéric de Saussure